Chris Kenny (born May 31, 1962) is a retired American soccer defender who played professionally in the North American Soccer League and Major Indoor Soccer League.

Youth
Kenny graduated from McCluer High School.  He attended Florissant Valley Community College where he was a 1981 junior college soccer All American.  He then transferred to St. Louis University where he was a 1983 Second Team All American soccer player.  He was inducted into the Billikens Athletic Hall of Fame in 1995.

Professional
In October 1983, the Los Angeles Lazers selected Kenny with the second overall pick of the 1983 Major Indoor Soccer League draft.  He signed with the Chicago Sting of the North American Soccer League, playing for them during the 1983-1984 NASL indoor season.  He then saw time in four games during the 1984 NASL outdoor season as the Sting won the league championship.  The team released him in November 1984.  He then signed with the St. Louis Steamers where he saw time in seven games during the 1985-1986 MISL season.  During the 1988 off season, Kenny moved to the Kansas City Comets.

References

External links
NASL/MISL stats

1952 births
Living people
American soccer players
Chicago Sting (NASL) players
Kansas City Comets (original MISL) players
Major Indoor Soccer League (1978–1992) players
North American Soccer League (1968–1984) indoor players
North American Soccer League (1968–1984) players
St. Louis Steamers (original MISL) players
Saint Louis Billikens men's soccer players
People from Florissant, Missouri
Soccer players from St. Louis
Association football defenders